Big Buffalo Creek is a stream in Jackson County in the U.S. state of South Dakota.

Big Buffalo Creek was named for the buffalo which grazed there.

See also
List of rivers of South Dakota

References

Rivers of Jackson County, South Dakota
Rivers of South Dakota